Amnat United Football Club (Thai สโมสรฟุตบอลอำนาจ ยูไนเต็ด), is a Thai semi professional football club based in Amnat Charoen province. The club was formed in 2011 and entered the Thai League 3 Northern Region.

The club changed their name from Amnat Charoen Town to Amnat Poly United in 2014, and to Amnat United in December 2016.

These team were taking a 2-years break. This team is automatically banned 2 years, don't get subsidy and relegated to 2020 Thai League 4 North Eastern Region.

Stadium and locations

Season by season record

P = Played
W = Games won
D = Games drawn
L = Games lost
F = Goals for
A = Goals against
Pts = Points
Pos = Final position

QR1 = First Qualifying Round
QR2 = Second Qualifying Round
R1 = Round 1
R2 = Round 2
R3 = Round 3
R4 = Round 4

R5 = Round 5
R6 = Round 6
QF = Quarter-finals
SF = Semi-finals
RU = Runners-up
W = Winners

References

External links
 Official website
 Facebookpage
 Official Facebookpage

Association football clubs established in 2011
Football clubs in Thailand
Amnat Charoen province
2011 establishments in Thailand